Adamia is a Georgian surname. Notable people with the surname include:

Geno Adamia (1936–1993), German military commander 
Giorgi Adamia (born 1981), Georgian footballer
Noah Adamia (1917–1942), Soviet sniper
Tako Adamia (born 1994/5), Georgian beauty pageant titleholder

Georgian-language surnames